Hot R&B/Hip-Hop Songs is a chart published by Billboard that ranks the top-performing songs in the United States in African-American-oriented musical genres; the chart has undergone various name changes since its launch in 1942 to reflect the evolution of such genres.  In 1970, it was published under the title Best Selling Soul Singles.  During that year, 16 different singles topped the chart, based on playlists submitted by radio stations and surveys of retail sales outlets.

In the issue of Billboard dated January 3, Diana Ross & the Supremes were at number one with "Someday We'll Be Together", the song's fourth and final week in the top spot.  It was the final Supremes singer to feature lead singer Diana Ross, who departed for a highly successful solo career; she would go on to achieve her first solo chart-topper later in the year with "Ain't No Mountain High Enough".  The Supremes, with new lead singer Jean Terrell, topped the chart again in December with "Stoned Love", but it would prove to be the group's final R&B number one.

The Jackson 5 displaced the Supremes from the top spot in the year's second issue of Billboard with "I Want You Back", giving the brothers their first number one with their debut single.  The group, all of whom were in their teens or younger, quickly experienced huge success, achieving four number-one R&B singles by the end of the year.  All four also topped the all-genre Hot 100 chart, making the group the first act ever to top that listing with its first four singles.  "I'll Be There", the Jackson 5's fourth number one of 1970, became the highest-selling single released by the Motown label.  The group spent a total of 20 weeks at number one in 1970; no other act spent more than six weeks in the top spot during the year.  In addition to the Jackson 5, the Moments gained their first career number one when "Love on a Two-Way Street" spent five weeks in the top spot in May and June.  In March, Brook Benton achieved his first chart-topper for nearly ten years when he reached number one with "Rainy Night in Georgia"; his last appearance in the top spot had been with "Kiddio" in 1960.

Chart history

References

1970
United States RandB
1970 in American music